Colesville is the name of some places in the United States of America:

 Colesville, Maryland
 Colesville, New York

See also
 Coalville
 Coalville, Utah